Mobarakeh (also Romanized as Mobārakeh and Mubārakeh) is a city and capital of Mobarakeh County, Isfahan Province, Iran.  At the 2006 census, its population was 62,454, in 16,583 families. Mobarakeh Steel Company (MSC, Persian: فولاد مبارکه, Foolad Mobarakeh) is an Iranian steel company, located 65 km south west of Esfahan, near the city of Mobarakeh. It is Iran's largest steel maker, and one of the largest industrial complexes operating in Iran. It was first commissioned after the Iranian Revolution in 1979 by the Saririans and officially initiated operations during 1993. Underwent major revamping during year 2000, and was scheduled for a second and third revamping in 2009–2010, bringing the total steel output to 7,200,000 metric tons per year. The company owns the successful football club, F.C. Sepahan.

References

Populated places in Mobarakeh County

Cities in Isfahan Province